First Methodist Episcopal Church of Tioga Center, also known as United Methodist Church of Tioga Center, is a historic Methodist Episcopal church located at Tioga in Tioga County, New York.  It is a vernacular Gothic Revival style rectangular structure built in 1872–1873.  It is a two-story frame structure that features a tower with louvered belfry and spire in the northeast corner.

It was listed on the National Register of Historic Places in 2002.

References

Churches on the National Register of Historic Places in New York (state)
Gothic Revival church buildings in New York (state)
Churches completed in 1873
19th-century Methodist church buildings in the United States
Churches in Tioga County, New York
Methodist churches in New York (state)
National Register of Historic Places in Tioga County, New York
1873 establishments in New York (state)